"Sweet Sixteen and Never Been Kissed" is a 1932 pop song released by the Blue Mountaineers as a 78 rpm record on the Regal label.  The B side was "We Just Couldn't Say Goodbye".  It was also released as a 10" 78 by the Midnight Minstrels on Broadcast Twelve Super in the same year (B side "Same Old Moon").  Copyright was registered 11 November 1932 in the US, words and music (with a ukulele accompaniment) attributed to Joseph George Gilbert, for Francis, Day and Hunter Ltd.

Covers
As well as the Blue Mountaineers and the Midnight Minstrels, the song or music was released by:
 Jack Hylton on Decca (F-3227) (23 September 1932) b-side "Pal of My Dreams"
 Peggy Cochrane on Broadcast Twelve Super (1933) (Popular Melodies On A Piano - Part 1)
 Nat Gonella, 1981, in the compilation LP album Georgia On My Mind on Decca (RFL 12).

In popular culture
 In Bingo calling, sixteen is announced as "Never been kissed, sweet sixteen".
 In Mary-Kate and Ashley's "Sweet Sixteen" series, volume 1 is called Never Been Kissed.

See also
 Sweet Sixteen (disambiguation)
 Never Been Kissed (disambiguation)
 Sweet Little Sixteen

References

1932 songs